Muhammad I ibn Pulad  was a Khan (r. 1342–1343) of the Chagatai Khanate. He was a great-great-grandson of Chagatai Khan Ghiyas-ud-din Baraq.

Not much is known about him other than the fact that he waged jihad against the Buddhist inhabitants of Xinjiang. According to Shajrat ul Atrak, he tried to halt the political dissolution within his ulus. Muhammad was apparently Muslim judging by his name.

References 

THE SHAJRAT UL ATRAK,OR GENEALOGICAL TREE OF THE TURKS AND TATARS; TRANSLATED AND ABRIDGED translated by Col. Miles.
Ц.Энхчимэг - "Монголын цагаадайн улс" 2006 он

Chagatai khans
Mongol Empire Muslims
14th-century monarchs in Asia
Year of death unknown
Year of birth unknown